The Asian Youth Beach Handball Championship is the official competition for youth men's and women's national Beach Handball teams of Asia, organised by Asian Handball Federation and takes place every four years. In addition to crowning the Asian champions, the tournament also serves as a qualifying tournament for the IHF Youth Beach Handball World Championship.

Men's tournament

Summary

Medal table

Women's tournament

Summary

Medal table

See also
 Asian Beach Handball Championship

References

External links
Asian Handball Federation

Beach handball competitions
Recurring sporting events established in 2016